Louie Moses is the founder and creative director of Moses, an independently owned American advertising agency in Phoenix, Arizona. Fast Company (magazine) referred to him as the "poster child for creativity" in Phoenix. His agency is the first Arizona advertising agency to win at the Clio Awards.

Career
Moses is best known for creating the Joe Boxer "Naked Cowboy" TV spot.

He is also known for his work for The Arizona Humane Society, US Airways, The Arizona Office of Tourism, Nintendo, Ubisoft, Taco Time and Shutters on the Beach Hotel.

He was selected as Ad Person of the Year in 1997.
He was selected as Tourism Person of the Year in 2000.
He has been the only Arizona member of the Art Directors Club of New York for 20 years.
His agency, Moses, has won more than 1000 creative awards, more than any other agency in Arizona.

In 2013, his agency was recognized nationally when it was chosen as the number one advertising agency in Arizona by Adweek. That same year, his agency was selected by Ultimate Gaming to launch Ultimate Casino – a real-money online casino in New Jersey.  

Moses plays drums in a local garage band called Random Karma. They have opened for Roger Clyne and the Peacemakers, The Ataris, Gin Blossoms, Sherman, Black Moods, Hickman Dalton Gang, The Flaming Lips, Robin Trower, Cowboy Mouth, Cracker and Just Off Turner. Moses' YouTube drum solo has over 120,000 views.

References

External links
 Adweek, "The United States of Ad Agencies"
 Addy Awards
 Ad Age, Meredith Deliso,"Moses Claims Blimpie Account", 2 November 2006
 New York Times, Stuart Elliott, "Word Up, Arizona"
 Why Advertising Has the Power to Advance How We Talk About Race in America
 Even if you aren't racist, your agency might be
 

Living people
Year of birth missing (living people)
American advertising executives
Businesspeople from Arizona